The 2022–23 McNeese Cowboys basketball team represented McNeese State University in the 2022–23 NCAA Division I men's basketball season. The Cowboys, led by second-year head coach John Aiken, played their home games on-campus at The Legacy Center in Lake Charles, Louisiana as members of the Southland Conference.

Previous season
The Cowboys finished the 2021–22 season with an 11–22 overall record and were 4–10 in conference play.  They qualified as the seventh seed in the 2022 Southland Conference men's basketball tournament winning their first round game against sixth seed Northwestern State 80–67.  Their season ended with a second round loss to third seeded New Orleans 78–82.

Preseason polls

Southland Conference Poll
The Southland Conference released its preseason poll on October 25, 2022. Receiving 97 votes overall, the Cowboys were picked to finish fifth in the conference.

Preseason All Conference
Christian Shumate was selected as a member of the Preseason All Conference first team.

Roster

Schedule and results

|-
!colspan=12 style=| Non-conference regular season

|-
!colspan=12 style=| Southland Conference regular season

|-
!colspan=12 style=| Southland Tournament

Source

See also
 2022–23 McNeese State Cowgirls basketball team

References

McNeese Cowboys basketball seasons
McNeese State Cowboys
McNeese State Cowboys basketball
McNeese State Cowboys basketball